Masty or Mosty is a city in Grodno Region, Belarus, and the administrative centre of Masty District.

History
Within the Grand Duchy of Lithuania, Masty was part of Trakai Voivodeship. In 1795, Masty was acquired by the Russian Empire as a result of the Third Partition of Poland.

From 1921 until 1939, Masty was part of the Second Polish Republic. In September 1939, the town was occupied by the Red Army and, on 14 November 1939, incorporated into the Byelorussian SSR.

From 25 June 1941 until 13 July 1944, Masty was occupied by Nazi Germany and administered as a part of Bezirk Bialystok.

Populated places in Grodno Region
Cities in Belarus
Trakai Voivodeship
Grodnensky Uyezd
Białystok Voivodeship (1919–1939)
Masty District